Julvécourt Aerodrome was a temporary World War I airfield in France.  It was located  West of Julvécourt,  in the Meuse department in Lorraine in north-eastern France.

Overview
The airfield was used from early 1916 by the French Air Services, until spring 1918, with six Bessonneau aircraft wood-and-canvas hangars, west of the village, along the D 21 road.

It was transferred to the American Air Services in the very last days of the war, with I Corps Observation Group HQ and two squadrons (1st Aero Squadron and 12th Aero Squadron) arriving on 3–5 November 1918.

The I Corps Observation Group HQ stayed at Julvécourt until demobilization in April 1919, but the two squadrons had left by the end of November 1918, ultimately bound for occupation forces in Germany.

The field was transferred back to the French authorities and then to agriculture. Today it is a series of cultivated fields with no indications of its wartime use.

Known units assigned
 Headquarters, I Corps Observation Group, 5 November 1918 - 15 April 1919
 12th Aero Squadron (Observation) 3–21 November 1918
 1st Aero Squadron (Observation) 5–21 November 1918.

See also

 List of Air Service American Expeditionary Force aerodromes in France

References

Notes

Sources
 Series "D", Volume 2, Squadron histories,. Gorrell's History of the American Expeditionary Forces Air Service, 1917–1919, National Archives, Washington, D.C.

External links

World War I sites of the United States
World War I airfields in France